Jammu and Kashmir is administered by the Republic of India within the framework of a federal parliamentary republic as a union territory, like the union territory of Puducherry, with a multi-party democratic system of governance. Until 2019, it was governed as a state administered by India. Politics in the region reflects the historical tension and dispute that the state has been a part of in the form of the Kashmir conflict. The head of state is the Lieutenant Governor of Jammu and Kashmir, currently Manoj Sinha, while the head of government is the Chief Minister of Jammu and Kashmir, currently vacant. Legislative power is vested in the Legislative Assembly of Jammu and Kashmir, although this was dissolved by the Governor on 21 November 2018. The judiciary is independent of the executive and the legislature.

History 
Gulab Singh has been called as the founder of the polity of Jammu and Kashmir. Following the 1860s, interaction with British India resulted in the region becoming a part of the geopolitical game between Russia and Britain. During the period of India's independence, the partition, up till and after India becoming a Republic, the question of Kashmir's future marked political decisions. The introduction of Pakistan into the internal political situation at this stage created complexities.

Some observers point out that the Kashmir conflict is a political issue. Amidst the political instability that the conflict has brought to the region, all the governments of Jammu and Kashmir have been engaged in attaining normalcy. The state has seen a "parallel existence of the democratic and separatist sphere of politics" and a shift from political hegemony till as late as 2002 to a multi-party system.

Historically Kashmiri Muslims preferred greater autonomy and sovereignty for the region or an independent Kashmir. However a minority of the non-Muslims who live in the region prefer the state to be fully integrated into India. Some Kashmiri Muslims also prefer to be part of Pakistan and a small part of Kashmir is under Pakistan control. There have also been a number of separatist movements, both political and militant, mostly led by Muslim leaders. However, in recent years there have been claims that a growing number of Kashmiri Muslims have been leaning towards remaining in India for economic and cultural reasons. A 2008 report by United Nations High Commissioner for Refugees determined that the State of Jammu and Kashmir was the only 'Partly free' state in India but it is now a Union Territory rather than a State. Human rights abuses in the Indian state of Jammu and Kashmir and a strong Indian army presence have also been an issue and affect the politics of the region.

In August 2019, the Government of India introduced the Jammu and Kashmir Reorganisation Bill, 2019 in the Rajya Sabha and moved resolution to scrap the Article 370 from the Constitution of India and bifurcate the state of Jammu and Kashmir into two Union Territories – Jammu & Kashmir with a legislation like Delhi, and Ladakh with a legislation like Chandigarh. Jammu and Kashmir was the only Indian state that had its own flag. However, as Article 370 of the Indian constitution, which granted Jammu and Kashmir autonomy, was abrogated in August 2019, the flag has lost its official status.

Political parties of Jammu & Kashmir 
List of political parties:

See also
 Politics of Ladakh
 2014 Jammu and Kashmir Legislative Assembly election
 Government of Jammu and Kashmir

References

Bibliography

Further reading

Chowdhary, Rekha. "Electoral Politics in the Context of Separatism and Political Divergence: An Analysis of 2009 Parliamentary elections in Jammu & Kashmir". South Asia Multidisciplinary Academic Journal, 3, 2009.